The following is the 1982–83 network television schedule for the three major English language commercial broadcast networks in the United States. The schedule covers primetime hours from September 1982 through August 1983. The schedule is followed by a list per network of returning series, new series, and series cancelled after the 1981–82 season. All times are Eastern and Pacific, with certain exceptions, such as Monday Night Football.

New series are highlighted in bold.

Each of the 30 highest-rated shows is listed with its rank and rating as determined by Nielsen Media Research.

 Yellow indicates the programs in the top 10 for the season.
 Cyan indicates the programs in the top 20 for the season.
 Magenta indicates the programs in the top 30 for the season.

PBS is not included; member stations have local flexibility over most of their schedules and broadcast times for network shows may vary.

Sunday

Monday

Tuesday

Wednesday 

Note: On CBS, a sitcom called Mama Malone was supposed to have aired 9:30-10 p.m., but was delayed when CBS decided to place Filthy Rich into the schedule.  Mama Malone did not air until the spring of 1984.

Thursday 

Note : Mama's Family was supposed to have aired on NBC 9:30-10 p.m., but was pushed back to midseason when NBC picked up Taxi.

Friday 

Note: On NBC, Eischied consisted of reruns of the network's 1979-80 crime drama series.

Saturday

By network

ABC

Returning Series
20/20
The ABC Sunday Night Movie
ABC NFL Monday Night Football
9 to 5
Benson
Dynasty
The Fall Guy
Fantasy Island
The Greatest American Hero
Happy Days
Hart to Hart
Joanie Loves Chachi
Laverne & Shirley
The Love Boat
Monday Night Baseball
T. J. Hooker
That's Incredible!
Three's Company
Too Close for Comfort

New Series
The 1/2 Hour Comedy Hour *
Amanda's *
At Ease *
Baby Makes Five *
Condo *
High Performance *
It Takes Two
Life's Most Embarrassing Moments
Matt Houston
The New Odd Couple
The Quest
The Renegades *
Reggie
Ripley's Believe It or Not!
Ryan's Four *
Star of the Family
Tales of the Gold Monkey

Not returning from 1981–82:
Barney Miller
Best of the West
Bosom Buddies
Code Red
Darkroom
King's Crossing
Maggie
Making a Living
Mork & Mindy
No Soap, Radio
Open All Night
The Phoenix
Police Squad!
Strike Force
Taxi (moved to NBC)
Today's FBI

CBS

Returning Series
60 Minutes
Alice
Archie Bunker's Place
Cagney & Lacey
Dallas
The Dukes of Hazzard
Falcon Crest
Filthy Rich
The Jeffersons
Knots Landing
M*A*S*H
Magnum, P.I.
One Day at a Time
Private Benjamin
Rosie
Simon & Simon
Trapper John, M.D.
Walt Disney

New Series
Ace Crawford, Private Eye *
Bring 'Em Back Alive
Foot in the Door *
Gloria
Goodnight, Beantown *
Gun Shy *
The Mississippi *
Newhart
On the Road with Charles Kuralt
Our Times with Bill Moyers
Seven Brides for Seven Brothers
Small & Frye *
Square Pegs
Tucker's Witch
Wizards and Warriors *
Zorro and Son *

Not returning from 1981–82:
Baker's Dozen
Herbie, the Love Bug
House Calls
The Incredible Hulk
Jessica Novak
Lou Grant
Making the Grade
Mr. Merlin
Nurse
Q.E.D.
Report to Murphy
The Two of Us
WKRP in Cincinnati

NBC

Returning Series
CHiPs
Diff'rent Strokes
The Facts of Life
Fame
Father Murphy
Gimme a Break!
Hill Street Blues
Love, Sidney
NBC Monday Night at the Movies
Quincy, M.E.
Real People
Taxi (moved from ABC)
Teachers Only *

New Series
The A-Team *
Bare Essence *
Buffalo Bill *
Casablanca *
Cheers
The Devlin Connection
Family Ties
The Family Tree *
Gavilan
Knight Rider
Little House: A New Beginning
Mama's Family *
Monitor *
The News Is the News *
The Powers of Matthew Star
Remington Steele
St. Elsewhere
Silver Spoons
Voyagers!

Not returning from 1981–82:
Barbara Mandrell and the Mandrell Sisters
The Billy Crystal Comedy Hour
Bret Maverick
Cassie & Co.
Chicago Story
Fitz and Bones
Flamingo Road
Harper Valley
Jokebook
Lewis & Clark
Little House on the Prairie
McClain's Law
Nashville Palace
NBC Magazine
One of the Boys
Television: Inside and Out

Note: The * indicates that the program was introduced in midseason.

References

United States primetime network television schedules
1982 in American television
1983 in American television